Khavar-e no was an Iranian Persian-language daily newspaper, published from Tabriz 1943 to 1945. Mahmud Torabi was the editor of the paper. Khavar-e no was founded as the regional organ of the Tudeh Party after the expulsion from the party of Ali Shabistari, the editor of the erstwhile Tudeh newspaper in the region, Azerbaijan. Shabistari had been expelled on the grounds of promoting Azeri nationalism. Khavar-e no was published with support from the Soviet Union.

References

External links
Archive of Khavar-e no issues.

1943 establishments in Iran
1945 disestablishments in Iran
Defunct newspapers published in Iran
Iran–Soviet Union relations
Mass media in Tabriz
Persian-language newspapers
Newspapers established in 1943
Publications disestablished in 1945
Publications of the Tudeh Party of Iran